The Filmfare Best Supporting Actor Award is given by the Filmfare magazine as part of its annual Filmfare Awards South for Malayalam films.

Winners

References

External links

Supporting Actor